A Haunting We Will Go is a 1949 animated short directed by Seymour Kneitel and narrated again by Frank Gallop, featuring Casper the Friendly Ghost.

Production  
It is the final Noveltoons cartoon featuring Casper, before he would be given his own cartoon series.

Plot 
Casper the Friendly Ghost, sad that he can make no friends since everyone he meets is afraid of him, hatches an abandoned egg and becomes the emerging little duck's best friend ("Dudley") and protector. Casper continues to try and teach his new best friend the ways of being a duck, and gives Dudley a rough idea on how to swim—but with no surprise, Dudley takes to it—like a duck to water. More perils persist as Casper rescues Dudley from a Duck Hunter as a decoy plot thickens.

Additional Voice Cast 
 Cecil Roy voices Casper
 Jack Mercer voices Turtle, Hunter
 Mae Questel voices Ghost Teacher (uncredited)

References

External links 
 

1949 animated films
1940s American animated films
American animated short films
1940s English-language films
Casper the Friendly Ghost films
1940s animated short films
Paramount Pictures short films
1949 short films
Animated films about ducks
American ghost films